Discovery Bay is an open oceanic embayment lying along the coast of eastern South Australia and western Victoria in south-eastern Australia.

Location and features
Cape Northumberland is the southernmost point of mainland South Australia. The Glenelg River is the principal inflow and enters the bay near the town of Nelson.

The bay was named by explorer Thomas Mitchell when he came down the river on 20 August 1836.

The South Australian section of the bay's coastline is protected by the Lower South East Marine Park while the Victorian section of the coast is protected in the Discovery Bay Coastal Park.  The waters at the eastern end of the bay, adjacent to Cape Bridgewater, are protected by the Discovery Bay Marine National Park.

See also
Discovery Bay (disambiguation)
Piccaninnie Ponds Conservation Park

References

External links
 
 
 

Bays of South Australia
Bays of Victoria (Australia)
Limestone Coast